money.co.uk is a UK-based price comparison website launched in 2008. It compares financial products including credit cards, bank savings, and mortgages. The company is regulated by the Financial Conduct Authority registered under Dot Zinc Ltd. In 2015 it was ranked as having the second fastest growing profits of the top 100 private companies in Britain by The Sunday Times BDO Profit Track 100 league table.

History
money.co.uk was launched under the parent company Dot Zinc Ltd, by founder and Managing Director Chris Morling, who featured 754th on Sunday Times Rich List 2015.

In the year to 31 October 2014, pre-tax profits were at £15.6 million  and the site has received an average of over 2.5 million visits a month.

In September 2017, ZPG plc, which owns the property website firm Zoopla, purchased the company in a £140 million deal.

Marketplace
money.co.uk compares financial products, with emphasis on things such as credit cards and bank savings rather than insurance like competitors. The site provides comparisons for around 60 products  and generates revenue through commissions from the financial products it offers.

As part of the company's business proposal, Hannah Maundrell, the Editor-in-Chief of money.co.uk, has been featured in the national press advising consumers about their online purchasing rights  and ways to manage credit and debt.

Operations
The company has an auditing process in place for any payday loan providers who wish to be listed on money.co.uk. If a lender or broker refuse to complete the questionnaire consisting of 70 questions, they will not be listed on the website. In the year to 23 July 2014 there were 38 brokers and lenders listed on the website. To aide customers in their financial comparison decision making, money.co.uk hosts finance-based guides.

The company previously had its head offices in the 150-year-old Cecily Hill Barracks, a former British Army barracks in Cirencester, Gloucestershire, known locally as ‘The Castle’. It also has a satellite office in London.

The main Cirencester offices are spread over three floors and include a staff gym, lounge and a games room that contains a foosball table that was formerly owned by Hollywood actor Robert Downey, Jr. In May 2015, the company was ranked seventh among all small UK companies on the Best Workplaces list.

Following a £3 million renovation of ‘The Castle’ by Bath-based workplace design and build firm Interaction, the company received huge press coverage.

Brand Overhaul
In 2014, the company underwent rebranding that involved a new logo, website and its first national TV advertising campaign, which featured competitive Los Angeles-based sign spinner Jeremy White.

In January 2017, a multimillion-pound campaign was launched with a TV advert showing scenarios where individuals checked different things, finishing with “you haven’t checked until you’ve checked money.co.uk”.

Awards
Winner – Best Online Comparison Site–eCommerce Awards 2013 
Winner – Best Mortgage Comparison Site – What Mortgage Awards 2013 
Finalist – Digital Business of the Year – National Business Awards 2013 
Winner – Best Overall Website – Digital Media Awards 2014 
Silver – Company of the Year, Financial Services – Stevie Awards 2014 
58th – The Sunday Times Hiscox Tech Track 100 league table 2014 
Second – The Sunday Times BDO Profit Track 100 league table 2015 
Seventh – Best Workplaces, Small Business – Best Workplaces 2015 
62nd – The Sunday Times Hiscox Profit Tech Track 100 league table 2015 
Winner – Best Comparison Site for Mortgages – What Mortgage Awards 2016
9th - Best Small Place to Work – Great Places to Work Awards 2016
7th - Best Small Place to Work - Great Places to Work Awards 2017
Runner up – Best Comparison Site for Mortgages – What Mortgage Awards 2017
2-star accreditation from Best Companies, BCI score: 711.5

References

Vehicle insurance
Financial services companies established in 2008
Comparison shopping websites
Online retailers of the United Kingdom
2008 establishments in the United Kingdom